Bhopal Badshahs (BB) was hockey team from Bhopal, Madhya Pradesh that competes in the World Series Hockey championship. The captain of the team is Sameer Dad, part of the Indian National Hockey Team. Bhopal Badshahs was coached by Vasudevan Bhaskaran, who led the Indian hockey team to victory in the 1980 Summer Olympics in Moscow. Badshahs defeated Chandigarh Comets in the inaugural match of 2012 World Series Hockey 4-3. Aishbagh Stadium, Bhopal is the home ground of Bhopal Badshahs.

Sponsors and partners

Dainik Bhaskar was the global partner for Bhopal Badshahs.

Team composition

The team was captained by Sameer Dad with Vasudevan Bhaskaran as coach. Initially the team was to be led by Sardara Singh but he opted not to play in the tournament as a result of his selection in the national team to play in London Olympics.

Performance

Fixtures and Results

2012

References

See also
World Series Hockey

World Series Hockey teams
Sport in Bhopal
2012 establishments in Madhya Pradesh
2013 disestablishments in India
Sports clubs established in 2012
Sports clubs disestablished in 2013